Yevgeniy Aleksandrovich Ryzhkov (born May 15, 1985 in Quaraghandy) is a Kazakhstani breaststroke and medley swimmer, who won the bronze medal over 200 m breaststroke at the 2006 Short Course World Championships.

Achievements
2006 FINA Short Course World Championships - bronze medal (200 m breaststroke)
2004 Olympic Games - disqualified (200 m individual medley)

References
 sports-reference

1985 births
Living people
Kazakhstani male breaststroke swimmers
Kazakhstani male medley swimmers
Olympic swimmers of Kazakhstan
Swimmers at the 2004 Summer Olympics
Swimmers at the 2008 Summer Olympics
Medalists at the FINA World Swimming Championships (25 m)
Asian Games medalists in swimming
Swimmers at the 2002 Asian Games
Swimmers at the 2006 Asian Games
Swimmers at the 2010 Asian Games
Medalists at the 2010 Asian Games
Asian Games bronze medalists for Kazakhstan
21st-century Kazakhstani people